Nantakan Petchplay (born ) is a retired Thai female volleyball player. 

She was part of the Thailand women's national volleyball team at the 1998 FIVB Volleyball Women's World Championship in Japan.

References

External links
http://www.fivb.org/EN/Volleyball/Competitions/WorldGrandPrix/2002/Teams/VB_Player.asp?No=13357

1977 births
Living people
Nantakan Petchplay
Place of birth missing (living people)
Nantakan Petchplay
Nantakan Petchplay